The 2004 ANZAC test was a rugby league test match played between Australia and New Zealand at the EnergyAustralia Stadium in Newcastle on 23 April 2004. It was the 5th Anzac test played between the two nations since the first was played under the Super League banner in 1997 and the first to be played in Newcastle.

Squads

Match Summary

References

2004 in Australian rugby league
2004 in New Zealand rugby league
Anzac Test
International rugby league competitions hosted by Australia
Rugby league in Newcastle, New South Wales